Lembah Pantai is a sub-district and parliamentary constituency in south-western Kuala Lumpur, Malaysia. Constituencies adjacent to Lembah Pantai are Seputeh, Segambut and Bukit Bintang. The total number of population is 148,094 as of 2020 census.

Demographics

Divisions

Bangsar
One of the more popular areas which come under Lembah Pantai constituency is Bangsar, a popular upmarket residential and entertainment area.

Pantai Dalam
Pantai Dalam is a residential area located south of Bangsar. There are many smaller residential areas that form the larger residential area of Pantai Dalam, including:
 Pantai Hillpark                                  
 Kampung Pantai                           
 PPR Sri Pantai
 PPR Pantai Ria
 Desa Aman 1 & 2                      
 Pantai Murni                        
 Taman Bukit Angkasa            
 Pantai Baru                  
 Kampung Pasir                
 Taman Pantai Dalam
 Taman Pantai Indah
 PPR Kampung Limau
 Taman Dato'

Pantai Dalam is a perfect watershed between two groups of urban Malays: the affluent and the working class. The former live mainly in gleaming, whitewashed condominiums like the Andalusia Condominium in Pantai Hillpark, or in luxury bungalows in Kampung Pantai and Pantai Halt.

For the working class, the luxury apartments located further uphill are perhaps symbols of what one can aspire to. Most of them live in the low-cost apartments.

Most of the area's residents are:
 blue-collar workers living in flats that had been sold to them under the People's Housing Project when they were resettled from their squatter homes several years ago.
 students of the University of Malaya.
 police officers/personnels, mainly in Desa Aman 1 & 2.

Some squatters are still waiting to buy homes under this project, which was announced by Prime Minister Abdullah Ahmad Badawi prior to the 12th Malaysian general election, 2008.

Pantai Dalam is well connected to the other parts of Klang Valley via the New Pantai Expressway and the Federal Highway.

Other divisions which are part of the Lembah Pantai constituency are Bangsar South, Bukit Aman, Bukit Persekutuan, KL Eco City, Mid Valley City and Perdana Botanical Gardens.

Transportation

Public transport 

 4 LRT stations for  Kelana Jaya Line:  Bangsar,  Abdullah Hukum,  Kerinchi and  Universiti LRT stations.
 3 KTM stations for  Port Klang Line:  Abdullah Hukum,  Angkasapuri and  Pantai Dalam Komuter stations.
 Only 1 KTM station for  Seremban Line:  Mid Valley Komuter station.

Car 

 Few major highways which cuts through most parts of the district includes the New Pantai Expressway (NPE) and Federal Highway.
 In the future, a new highway known as Setiawangsa–Pantai Expressway (SPE) will be opened, currently under construction.

Politics
The current Member of Parliament for the Lembah Pantai parliamentary constituency is Fahmi Fadzil from Pakatan Harapan, who won the seat in the 2018 Malaysian general election.

References

 New dimension to urban voting, The Star, 2 March 2008.

Suburbs in Kuala Lumpur